Hadj Mohammed Mesfewi (died June 13, 1906), called the "Marrakesh Arch-Killer", was a Moroccan serial killer who murdered at least 36 women.

Killings 
Mesfewi worked as a shoemaker and trader in Marrakesh. Assisted by a 70-year-old woman named Annah, Mesfewi would kill young women who came to his shop to dictate letters. He would use drugs to incapacitate his victims before decapitating them with a dagger. Moroccan authorities found the remains of 20 mutilated bodies in a deep pit under his shop, another 16 were discovered in the garden outside. He was caught after the parents of one young victim traced her movements back to his shop. Annah died under torture and Mesfewi confessed that he killed them for their money; often the sums were very small.

Execution
After being convicted, Mesfewi was initially sentenced to be crucified on May 2, 1906. Due to international outcry, the sentence was changed to beheading. However, public sentiment in Marrakesh was for him to suffer so every day he was led from his cell, into the market square, and lashed ten times with a rod made from thorny acacia on a daily basis for four weeks. It was finally decided because of the heinous nature of his crimes and as a warning for all, Mesfewi would be walled up alive in the Marrakesh marketplace bazaar on June 11, 1906.

Chains were fixed to the back wall to ensure Mesfewi did not attempt to escape and to keep him standing. On the day his sentence was carried out, Mesfewi screamed for mercy and fought with his jailers when he was led to the cell. After he had been chained up, bystanders threw filth and offal at him. The masons then came forward and began laying courses of masonry to brick up the opening. After his entombment, the crowd would be silent, but then cheer every time they heard him scream inside. Mesfewi could be heard for two days before falling silent on the third day. Following his death, many in the crowd voiced their anger that he had died too quickly.

Literature 

 Peter Murakami, Julia Murakami: Dictionary of serial killers: 450 case studies of a pathological killing type. Ullstein Paperback, 2000, .

See also
List of serial killers by country
List of serial killers by number of victims

Notes

1800s births
1906 deaths
1906 murders in Africa
Executed Moroccan serial killers
Male serial killers
Murder in Morocco
1900s murders in Morocco
People executed by Morocco
Violence against women in Morocco